Flamenco is a 1952 Spanish documentary film directed by Edgar Neville. It was entered into the 1953 Cannes Film Festival.

Plot 
Title changed to "Flamenco" when it was first released in the USA in 1954, this is a program of Spanish songs and dances with the emphasis on "flamenco" or gypsy contributions. The USA version has an English narrative written by Walter Terry, the dance critic of the "New York Herald Tribune" newspaper.  Heading the cast are Antonio (I), Pilar Lopez and Maria Luz, three of Spain's foremost dancers of the time, accompanied by members of the Ballet Espanol.

References

External links

1952 films
1950s Spanish-language films
Spanish documentary films
Films directed by Edgar Neville
Documentary films about flamenco
1952 documentary films
1950s dance films
1950s Spanish films